Ceratocanthus is a genus of pill scarab beetles in the family Hybosoridae. There are more than 50 described species in Ceratocanthus.

Species
These 53 species belong to the genus Ceratocanthus:

 Ceratocanthus aeneus (MacLeay, 1819) (shining ball scarab beetle)
 Ceratocanthus amazonicus Paulian, 1982
 Ceratocanthus aureolus (Harold, 1874)
 Ceratocanthus baniensis Howden, 1978
 Ceratocanthus basilicus (Germar, 1843)
 Ceratocanthus bicinctoides Paulian, 1982
 Ceratocanthus bicinctus (Erichson, 1843)
 Ceratocanthus bonfilsi Chalumeau, 1977
 Ceratocanthus brasiliensis (Lansberge, 1887)
 Ceratocanthus chalceus (Germar, 1843)
 Ceratocanthus clypealis (Lansberge, 1887)
 Ceratocanthus ebeninus (Erichson, 1843)
 Ceratocanthus eberti Paulian, 1982
 Ceratocanthus eulampros (Bates, 1887)
 Ceratocanthus fuscoviridis (Ohaus, 1911)
 Ceratocanthus globulus (Erichson, 1843)
 Ceratocanthus gundlachi (Harold, 1874)
 Ceratocanthus humeralis (Erichson, 1843)
 Ceratocanthus inca Paulian, 1982
 Ceratocanthus major Paulian, 1982
 Ceratocanthus mathani Paulian, 1982
 Ceratocanthus micans (Harold, 1874)
 Ceratocanthus micros (Bates, 1887)
 Ceratocanthus monrosi (Martinez & Pereira, 1959)
 Ceratocanthus nanus (Germar, 1843)
 Ceratocanthus niger Paulian, 1982
 Ceratocanthus nitidus (Germar, 1843)
 Ceratocanthus pararelucens Howden, 1978
 Ceratocanthus pauliani (Delgado & Hernandez, 1998)
 Ceratocanthus pecki Paulian, 1982
 Ceratocanthus perpunctatus Paulian, 1982
 Ceratocanthus politus (Erichson, 1843)
 Ceratocanthus pseudosuturalis Paulian, 1982
 Ceratocanthus punctolineatus Paulian, 1982
 Ceratocanthus punctulatus (Lansberge, 1887)
 Ceratocanthus pyritosus (Erichson, 1843)
 Ceratocanthus quadristriatus Paulian & Vaz-de-mello, 1998
 Ceratocanthus relucens (Bates, 1887)
 Ceratocanthus rotundicollis (Bates, 1887)
 Ceratocanthus semipunctatus (Germar, 1843)
 Ceratocanthus semistriatus (Germar, 1843)
 Ceratocanthus seriatus (Erichson, 1843)
 Ceratocanthus sesquistriatus (Germar, 1843)
 Ceratocanthus sexstriatus Paulian, 1982
 Ceratocanthus spinicornis (Fabricius, 1775)
 Ceratocanthus steinbachi Paulian, 1982
 Ceratocanthus striatulus (Lansberge, 1887)
 Ceratocanthus suturalis (Lansberge, 1887)
 Ceratocanthus suturaloides Paulian, 1982
 Ceratocanthus termiticola (Wasmann, 1894)
 Ceratocanthus turquinensis (Zayas, 1988)
 Ceratocanthus undulatus (Harold, 1874)
 Ceratocanthus vicarius (Bates, 1887)

References

Further reading

 
 

Scarabaeoidea genera
Articles created by Qbugbot